Eucalyptus cosmophylla, commonly known as cup gum, bog gum or  scrub gum, is a species of small tree or mallee that is endemic to South Australia. It usually has smooth bark and lance-shaped adult leaves, flower buds arranged in groups of three, white flowers and cup-shaped, cylindrical or hemispherical fruit.

Description
Young plants and coppice regrowth have stems that are more or less square in cross-section and juvenile leaves that have a petiole. They are green to yellow with a rounded or conical to beaked operculum usually shorter than the hypanthium. Flowering occurs between July and November and the flowers are white to cream-coloured with all anthers being fertile. The fruit generally has two ribs, a thick rim and broad valves with the tips usually just below the rim. The brown seeds are polyhedral and have narrow wings along the main edges.

Taxonomy and naming
Eucalyptus cosmophylla was first formally described in 1855 by Ferdinand von Mueller from specimens collected "on stony places in the Lofty and Bugle Ranges" and the description was published in Transactions and Proceedings of the Victorian Institute for the Advancement of Science. The specific epithet (cosmophylla) is derived from the Ancient Greek words kosmos meaning "ornament", "decoration" or "dress" and phyllon meaning "leaf".

Distribution and habitat
Cup gum grows near the sea in open shrubland, open forest and heath, usually in soils of low fertility. It is found in the southern Lofty Ranges, Fleurieu Peninsula and on Kangaroo Island.

See also
List of Eucalyptus species

References

Further reading
 Seberg, O. (1986) New Information on Ferdinand J. H. Mueller's Early Taxonomic Papers (1854-1856). Taxon 35, 262-271.JSTOR

External links

Trees of Australia
cosmophylla
Myrtales of Australia
Flora of South Australia
Taxa named by Ferdinand von Mueller
Plants described in 1855